As the capital and largest city of Bosnia and Herzegovina, Sarajevo is naturally the main center of the country's media. Most of the country's major television channels are based in the city, as are the most popular newspapers and magazines.

Newspapers are the most popular and most well established forms of media. The two most popular and credible daily newspapers are the Oslobođenje and the Dnevni avaz, The buildings of both of these are adjacent to each other, situated in Novi Grad municipality, making the spot the center of the Bosnian media world.

The Dnevni avaz (the Daily Voice) is today the more successful of the two. It was claimed to have ties with the powerful Party of Democratic Action, which some take to explain its success. Later however it shifted its supported among the other parties. The Oslobođenje is the older and more well known of the two. Meaning "The Liberation", it was established in Sarajevo following World War II as the communist party's newspaper. Oslobođenje preserved somewhat leftist views. Novi Plamen, a monthly magazine, is the most left-wing publication currently.

Infostaza is the first newspaper in Bosnia and Herzegovina that is published exclusively online. It offers a wide range of daily news and current topics.

As well as professional newspapers, Sarajevo is also home to a variety of magazines and political tabloids, such as Slobodna Bosna, Dani, and Walter, all of which have a high circulation.

Television is very popular in Sarajevo, even though for most people the number of channels is somewhat limited. Satellites allow for a number of foreign channels to be watched, but the most popular are the local news stations based in the city. Federalna televizija (FTV) is the television of the Federation of Bosnia and Herzegovina entity, while there is also a national radio-television system named Public Broadcast Service of Bosnia and Herzegovina. A Sarajevo Cantonal channel is also available.

After the government affiliated channels there are several other television stations, perhaps the most prominent being Hayat TV. Another is the Open Broadcast Network, a television station founded by the International community, now privately owned. Television stations from Croatia are also available, as is Serbian Eastern European media giant RTV Pink, with Pink BH Company, the local branch based in Bijeljina.

Many small independent radio stations exist, although the majority listen to the more established ones such as Radio M, Radio Grad, eFM Student Radio and RSG. RSG, Radio Stari Grad (Radio Old Town) is the most popular of these. Radio Free Europe can still be heard, and several American and West European stations are available for listening as well. Also popular is Radio 202, affiliated with FTV.

References

Mass media in Bosnia and Herzegovina